Iranna Kadadi is an Indian politician and a Member of Parliament representing Karnataka in the Rajya Sabha. He served as the Belagavi district Panchayat president in 2010. He also served as Bharatiya Janata Party's Belagavi district unit president. He also served as the chairman of NGEF, Hubli

Kadadi had unsuccessfully contested the assembly election from Arabhavi constituency in 1994 on a BJP ticket. Kadadi belongs to Veerashiva Lingayat community from  Belagavi district.

His nomination along with Ashok Gasti to the Rajya Sabha in 2020 came as a surprise from the national leadership of Bharatiya Janata Party as they were never in the limelight. The BJP later said that the party believes in appreciating grass root level workers, hence rewarded them with this opportunity.

Early life

Eranna Kadadi was associated with the BJP from his student days through the Akhil Bharatiya Vidyarthi Parishad (ABVP) and later got involved in the organisation work for the BJP. He started his active political career in 1989.

References

Bharatiya Janata Party politicians from Karnataka
Rajya Sabha members from Karnataka
Members of Parliament from Karnataka
People from Belagavi district
1966 births
Living people